John James Sborz (born January 24, 1985) is an American professional baseball pitcher who played for the Detroit Tigers of Major League Baseball in 2010.

Professional career
Sborz attended Langley High School in McLean, Virginia, and pitched for the school's baseball team. He threw a no-hitter in his senior year. The Detroit Tigers selected Sborz in the second round of the 2003 MLB draft. Sborz missed most of the 2006 season due to shoulder tendonitis, and had surgery that caused him to miss much of the 2007 season.

The Tigers promoted Sborz to the major leagues on June 21, 2010, to take the roster spot of Rick Porcello, who was sent down to the minors the day before. He made his major league debut the next day, at Citi Field against the New York Mets, and hit the first two batters he faced. He was optioned to the Toledo Mud Hens two days later.

Personal
Sborz's brother, Josh, has also pitched in MLB.

References

External links

1985 births
Living people
Gulf Coast Tigers players
West Michigan Whitecaps players
Oneonta Tigers players
Lakeland Flying Tigers players
Toledo Mud Hens players
Erie SeaWolves players
Detroit Tigers players
Baseball players from Washington, D.C.